"Wuthering Heights" is a song by English singer Kate Bush, released as her debut single on 20 January 1978 through EMI Records. Inspired by the 1847 Emily Brontë novel of the same name, the song was released as the lead single from Bush's debut studio album, The Kick Inside (1978). It peaked at number one on the UK Singles Chart for four weeks. It also reached the top of the charts in Australia, Ireland, Italy, New Zealand and Portugal. With this song, Bush became the first female artist in the United Kingdom to achieve a number-one single with a self-penned song.

"Wuthering Heights" received widespread critical acclaim and continues to be highly regarded; in 2016, Pitchfork named it the fifth-greatest song of the 1970s, and in 2020, The Guardian ranked it as the 14th-best UK number-one single. The song has been certified Platinum by the British Phonographic Industry (BPI), for sales and streams of over 600,000 units in the United Kingdom. A remixed version of the song, featuring re-recorded vocals, was included on Bush's first compilation album, The Whole Story (1986). This version appears as the B-side to her 1986 single "Experiment IV".

Writing 
Bush wrote the song aged 18, within a few hours late at night on 5 March 1977. She was inspired after seeing the 1967 BBC adaptation of the 1847 novel Wuthering Heights. She then read the book, and also discovered that she shared her birthday with author Emily Brontë.

"Wuthering Heights" is sung from the perspective of the Wuthering Heights character Catherine Earnshaw, pleading at Heathcliff's window to be allowed in. It quotes Catherine's dialogue, including the lyrics "I'm so cold", "let me in", and "bad dreams in the night". Cathy is in fact a ghost, which the listener may only realise upon reading the novel. Critic Simon Reynolds described it as "Gothic romance distilled into four-and-a-half minutes of gaseous rhapsody".

Bush recorded her vocal in a single take. The guitar solo is played by Ian Bairnson, who said that he initially disliked the tone for many years due to "purely guitarist reasons". Engineer Jon Kelly said he regretted not placing the solo louder in the mix. The production team, with Bush, began mixing at midnight and stayed until "five or six in the morning".

Bush's record company, EMI, originally chose another track, "James and the Cold Gun", as the lead single, but Bush was determined to use "Wuthering Heights". The single was initially scheduled for 4 November 1977. However, Bush was unhappy with the cover and insisted it be replaced. Some copies of the single had already been sent out to radio stations, but EMI relented and put back the single's launch until 20 January 1978.

"Wuthering Heights" entered the charts in the week ending 11 February 1978 at No. 42. The following week it rose to No. 27, and Bush made her first appearance on Top of the Pops. The song was finally added to BBC Radio 1's playlist the following week and became one of the most played records on radio. In 1986, the first pressings of her first compilation album erroneously stated the release date for this single as 4 November 1977.

Music video and cover artwork 

Two music videos with similar choreography were created to accompany "Wuthering Heights". Bush created the choreography and dance moves to suggest her character is a ghost (as in this scene in the novel), without explicitly stating as much. In the first version, known as the indoor version, made for the UK and European release, Bush is shown performing the song in a dark room filled with white mist while wearing a white dress. Critics have described this video as a milestone in the history of music videos before the MTV era, with Pitchfork putting it on number three on the list of greatest music videos from the 70s.

In the outside version, Bush is shown dancing—'out in the wily, windy moors'—in a grassy area located in Salisbury Plain (inspired by the novel's moors) with Scots pine trees in the background, on an overcast day, while wearing a flowy red dress. The red dress has been referenced numerous times in popular culture and similar dresses have been worn by her fans at events such as "The Most Wuthering Heights Day Ever" where her dance routine is recreated.

The single cover artwork mirrored that used for the album cover which featured a photograph of Bush, "clinging to a large painted dragon kite, gliding across a vast, all-seeing eye", taken by Jay Myrdal.

Chart performance 

After being delayed for two months, "Wuthering Heights" was officially released in early 1978 and entered the top forty in the official singles chart in the United Kingdom at number twenty-seven on 18 February, and quickly rose to number one three weeks later dethroning ABBA's "Take a Chance on Me" from the top spot. Bush became the first female artist to have an entirely self-penned number one hit in the UK. The single release unwittingly pitted Bush against another female vocalist also charting with her first UK hit: Debbie Harry with her band Blondie and their single "Denis". Amid much public discussion about the two singers' respective merits, Bush came out on top, while Blondie stalled at number two. "Wuthering Heights" remained at number one for a month until it was replaced at the top by Brian and Michael's celebration of the then-recently deceased artist L. S. Lowry, "Matchstalk Men and Matchstalk Cats and Dogs". Bush's début single finished the year as the tenth highest-selling and was certified gold by the British Phonographic Industry, denoting sales of over half a million.

Success was not limited to the United Kingdom, as "Wuthering Heights" also hit number one in Ireland. It reached the top ten in Belgium, the Netherlands, Finland, Norway, Sweden, and Switzerland, as well as the top twenty in Austria and West Germany. She had performed the song on the first episode of the West German music talk show Bio's Bahnhof on 9 February 1978. "Wuthering Heights" also proved to be successful in New Zealand, where it spent five weeks at number one and achieved platinum status, and in Australia, where it stayed at the top of the charts for three consecutive weeks and achieved gold status. It proved to be one of the biggest hits of 1978 in Denmark.

Following the live performance of the song by Laura Bunting on The Voice in Australia, "Wuthering Heights" re-entered the country's top forty in 2012, 34 years after its original release in 1978.

Legacy

A remixed version, featuring rerecorded vocals, was included on the 1986 greatest hits album The Whole Story. This version also appeared as the B-side to her 1986 hit "Experiment IV".

Pat Benatar recorded a cover version of "Wuthering Heights" for her 1980 album Crimes of Passion.

In 2018, as part of the Bradford Literature Festival, it was announced that Bush had been invited to write an epitaph to Emily Brontë, which would be inscribed on one of four stones erected near the Brontë's home in Haworth, West Yorkshire. Commenting on the unveiling of her poem, entitled Emily, Bush said "to be asked to write a piece for Emily’s stone is an honour and, in a way, a chance to say thank you to her".

A flashmob event known as The Most Wuthering Heights Day Ever was officially created in 2016 and is held annually. Fans gather in locations around the world to recreate the "red dress" video. Upon seeing a video clip of the event, Bush said that she found it "very touching and sweet".

The song has been interpreted by comedians Steve Coogan and Noel Fielding, on two occasions, as part of the BBC fundraising telethon Comic Relief. Coogan sang the song in the 1999 show as part of a medley of other Bush material in character as Alan Partridge. Fielding performed to the song in the 2011 series of Let's Dance for Comic Relief, placing in the final of the competition.

Personnel 
 Kate Bush – vocals, piano
 Andrew Powell – arrangements, bass guitar, celeste
 Duncan Mackay – Hammond organ
 David Paton – acoustic guitar
 Ian Bairnson – electric guitar, guitar solo
 Stuart Elliott – drums
 Morris Pert – percussion
 David Katz – orchestral contractor

Charts

Weekly charts

Year-end charts

Certifications and sales

See also 
 List of number-one singles in Australia during the 1970s

References

External links
 

1977 songs
1978 debut singles
Kate Bush songs
Number-one singles in Australia
Number-one singles in New Zealand
Irish Singles Chart number-one singles
UK Singles Chart number-one singles
Songs written by Kate Bush
EMI Records singles
Works based on Wuthering Heights
Song recordings produced by Andrew Powell
Music based on novels
Pop ballads
1970s ballads
Rock ballads
Songs about ghosts
Songs about fictional characters